is a railway station in the city of Tsuruoka, Yamagata,  Japan, operated by JR East. It is located on the border between Yamagata Prefecture and Niigata Prefecture.

Lines

Station layout
The station has one island platform and one side platform connected to the station building by an underground passage. The station is unattended.

Platforms

History
Nezugaseki Station opened on November 23, 1923. A new station building was completed in October 1986. With the privatization of JNR on April 1, 1987, the station came under the control of JR East.

Surrounding area
Nezugaseki Marina
Nezugaseki Post Office

See also
List of railway stations in Japan

References

External links

 JR East Station information 

Stations of East Japan Railway Company
Railway stations in Yamagata Prefecture
Uetsu Main Line
Railway stations in Japan opened in 1923
Tsuruoka, Yamagata